Eukaryotic translation initiation factor 3 subunit I (eIF3i) is a protein that in humans is encoded by the EIF3I gene.

Interactions 

eIF3i has been shown to interact with TGF beta 1 and eIF3a.

See also 
Eukaryotic initiation factor 3 (eIF3)

References

Further reading